Blackwood Town Cricket Club is a local Welsh cricket club that plays in the Glamorgan and Monmouthsire Cricket League Division 1.  The club formed in the early 1950s and originally played on the Showfield in Blackwood, moving to its current location, Highfields, at the top of Gordon Road in 1955.  The ground cost £200 to buy and the club members did the vast majority of work on it themselves, ferrying soil from Markham Common and having the local authority dump rubbish on the ground in order to make the ground flat as there was a slope from the site of the current pavilion to the far side that needed to be filled in.  The first match at the new ground was against Glamorgan Colts.

The club runs 2 senior Saturday sides, the 1st and 2nd XIs both play in the above League's top division - the 2nd XI staying up despite finishing bottom in Division 1 due to a club in Division 2 not fulfilling the promotion criteria.  From 2011, the club will also be returning to midweek action in the Caerphilly and District Midweek League giving regular cricket each Tuesday.

The club was previously in the South Wales Premier League in 2009 but due to that League's reorganisation the club is now in the top division of the feeder league

The club fields youth teams in the Under 11, Under 13, Under 15 and Under 17 age groups and both teams have been very successful, the under 15s were the all Wales Champions in 2005 and the Under 17s won the Monmouthshire Cricket Association's U17 League in 2011 by beating Chepstow in the final at Highfields.

In 2014 the club won the Macey cup, which is a twenty-over competition run by Monmouthshire Cricket Association. They beat Panteg in the final which was played at Newbridge CC.

The current first XI Captain is once again Richard Matthews and second XI Captain is Ryan Johnston, third XI captain is Rhys Norville and the 4th XI is led by Chris Coleman lookalike, Peter Jenkins!

Former Labour Party Leader Neil Kinnock is a former Honorary President of the Club

References 

I William Coppage i am the currant President of the Club and have been since October 1985 and still to this day for your records

External links 
 

Welsh club cricket teams
1950s establishments in Wales